The Minister of Labour and Immigration of the Canadian province of Manitoba is a member of the Executive Council of Manitoba, which is informally known as the Cabinet. This position was formerly known as the Minister of Labour. The Current Minister of Labour and Immigration is Jon Reyes.

From January 13, 2012, to October 18, 2013, the responsibilities of this portfolio were redistributed between the Minister of Family Services and Labour and the Minister of Immigration and Multiculturalism.

List of Ministers of Labour/Labour and Immigration in Manitoba
(*) Official title: Minister of Labour and Manpower.
(**)  Official title: Minister of Labour and Housing.

Labour and Immigration, Minister of
Manitoba
Labour in Canada